Glenn Edward Vaughan (February 16, 1944 – December 18, 2004), nicknamed "Sparky", was an American professional baseball player for three seasons, 1962–1964. A shortstop, he was the nephew of Baseball Hall of Fame shortstop Arky Vaughan.

Born in Compton, California, Glenn Vaughan graduated from Lamar High School in Houston, Texas and attended the University of Houston. In 1962 he signed with the local Major League Baseball team, the Houston Colt .45s, and played three seasons in its farm system. In , he was recalled by the Colt .45s in September after splitting the campaign between the Double-A San Antonio Bullets and the Triple-A Oklahoma City 89ers.  He started nine MLB games — eight as a shortstop, and one, on September 27, as a third baseman on a day when Houston started an all-rookie lineup (Sonny Jackson was the shortstop). Vaughan batted 30 times and collected five hits, all singles.

After retiring from baseball, Vaughan entered the insurance and real estate businesses in Houston. He died from natural causes at the age of 60.

References

External links

1944 births
2004 deaths
Baseball players from Houston
Businesspeople from Houston
Businesspeople from Texas
Durham Bulls players
Houston Colt .45s players
Major League Baseball shortstops
Oklahoma City 89ers players
San Antonio Bullets players
20th-century American businesspeople